The Burkinabe ambassador in Berlin is the official representative of the Government in Ouagadougou to the Government of Germany. He is concurrently accredited in Tallinn (Estonia).

List of representatives

References 

 
Germany
Burkina Faso